The 2010 British Superbike season was the 23rd British Superbike Championship season. The season commenced on 5 April at Brands Hatch and ended on 10 October at Oulton Park after 26 races at twelve meetings held in England and Scotland.
Due to the economic climate many rule changes were discussed including one bike per rider and the banning of electronic aids. The season featured a new Evo Class for less-developed bikes and a new 'Showdown' points system to keep the championship close until the end.

After a spell in the Superbike World Championship, 2006 and 2007 champion Ryuichi Kiyonari returned to the championship and duly picked up his third championship title, with superior results in the seven-race Showdown element of the championship; winning three races, to add to four he picked up in the first part of the season. His HM Plant Honda teammate Josh Brookes finished as runner-up, taking five victories as he finished 24 points behind Kiyonari. Tommy Hill finished third, having tailed off from a positive start to the season, having finished each of the first six races in the top three placings. He ended the season with four victories and 15 podiums. Michael Laverty finished fourth in the championship with two wins, with the Ducati of Michael Rutter – another double race-winner – finishing in between Laverty and his teammate Alastair Seeley, who took a single victory at Brands Hatch. Three other riders took race victories during the season; Swan Honda racers James Ellison and Stuart Easton took three wins between them, as they finished the season in seventh and ninth places respectively, while Tom Sykes took two wins on a single wildcard outing from his normal World Superbike commitments.

The début season of the Evolution Class was, for the most part, a two-rider battle for the championship. Steve Brogan, riding a BMW for Jentin Racing and Hudson Kennaugh, riding a Kawasaki for Malcolm Ashley Racing and an Aprilia for Splitlath Motorsport, duked it out for class glory. By season's end, just three points separated the two riders, with Brogan finishing as victor, winning the class on twelve occasions. Kennaugh won seven, including the best result for an Evo rider, finishing in ninth place in the second race of the first Oulton Park meeting. Gary Johnson, Chris Burns and David Anthony also won two races, while Pauli Pekkanen took a single victory at Brands Hatch.

Rule changes
New for 2010 was an "Evolution Class", to replace the Privateers Cup, and was designed for teams to enter the championship for a reduced cost. The new rules attracted larger numbers than the Privateers Cup, and also attracted three new manufacturers in KTM, Aprilia and BMW. The Evo rules allowed for full Superbike rolling chassis allied to stock engines and a control ECU which eliminates rider aids.

Series organisers MotorSport Vision announced a series of rule changes on 3 February 2010. Qualifying was altered, with the "Roll for Pole" only setting the grid for race one of each weekend. This was due to the race two grid being set by the fastest laps of each rider in race one. Also introduced was a "second chance" system if a rider crashes on lap one, that rider only dropped eight places from where they started the first race. At the triple-race meetings, the same rules applied for race two, but were also applied for race three.

Championship restructure
Perhaps the biggest rule change was the dividing of the championship into two parts. The first nine meetings, totalling nineteen races, formed the "Main Season" of the championship, before the final three meetings, the remaining seven races, make up "The Showdown". The championship change was introduced after Leon Camier clinched the 2009 title with four races to spare, thus introducing a crescendo of competition.

The normal FIM point-scoring system still applied, with 25 for the winner all the way down to a single point for fifteenth place. At the end of the Main Season, all riders dropped their two worst scores, which had to be from events they qualified for. From this points order, the first six riders in the championship standings were elevated to a new base level and became the Title Fighters for the final three events and seven races of the championship.

The six-rider format was based on the 2007–10 NASCAR Playoffs format of rewarding wins with bonus points for the playoff.  Unlike the NASCAR Playoff format where only wins awarded bonus points, any top-three finish in the Main Season was awarded bonus points, referred as Podium Credits. A win was worth three bonus points, second place was worth two bonus points, and third place was worth one bonus point. Each Title Fighter started The Showdown with 500 points and bonus points earned for each podium finish. The standard points scoring format from the Main Season then continued for The Showdown, with all points scores from the final seven races counting. All riders outside of the Title Fighters continued to race for the BSB Riders' Cup, continuing to add to their points total from the end of the Main Season. This also applied to the new Evolution class.

Qualifying changes
The Swan Combi Roll for Pole remained, but set the grid for Race 1 only. All riders take to the track for Q1 over 20 minutes. The field was then whittled down to 20 riders in Q2 over 12 minutes, and then the final 8 minutes shoot-out for pole position by the top 10 riders in Q3. Significantly all the riders were on race rubber during all the qualifying sessions. The Race 2 grid was then established by the order of the riders best lap times set during Race 1. If a rider suffered a crash or mechanical failure before the end of the first lap in Race 1, the rider lined up for Race 2 in their Race 1 starting grid position plus 8 "penalty places".

Calendar
 A provisional calendar had been released on 11 October 2009, with twelve rounds listed, including a provisional date at Donington Park due to renovation of the circuit. Two months later, a revised calendar was released, with Donington Park losing the rights to hold their race on 10–12 September, after Donington Ventures Leisure Ltd was placed into administration. These dates were latterly used for a round at Croft, with a second meeting at Cadwell Park replacing the original Croft date.

Notes:
1. – The second race at Knockhill was cancelled due to bad weather conditions. As a result, the race was run at the next round of the championship at Snetterton, with the second race grid positions standing for the race.

Entry list

Championship standings

Riders Championship

Evolution Championship

Manufacturers Championship

References

External links
 The official website of the British Superbike Championship

British
British Superbike Championship
Superbike